Charles van den Eycken or Charles van den Eycken the younger (17 April 1859 – 27 December 1923), sometimes known as Duchêne, was a well-known Belgian painter specializing in pictures of interiors, dogs and cats.

Life
Van den Eycken was born in Brussels. His grandfather Frans was a decorative painter and his father, also called Charles, a successful painter of landscapes in the 17th-century Dutch style.

He first was a pupil of his father.  He subsequently studied with Joseph Stevens, a realist animal painter, at the Académie des Beaux-Arts in Brussels. He later also studied at the Academy of Louvain.  From 1881 he exhibited regularly in the Salons of Brussels, Liège, Ghent and Antwerp, as well as in the Netherlands, Germany and Spain. He painted several pictures for Queen Marie-Henriette of Belgium. He was a member of the artist group "l'Essor" and obtained several medals.

His usual signature was Ch. van den Eycken.  He sometimes signed his works Charles Duchêne.

He painted dogs and cats engaged in all kinds of activities. He also painted some portraits of dogs. He died in Brussels.

Notes and references

Bibliography 
 Akoun, Jacky-Armand, 2012: La côte des peintres. Editions Babylone
 Bénézit, E., 1999: Dictionnaire critique des peintres, sculpteurs, dessinateurs et graveurs. Paris: Gründ
 Berko, P. & V., 1981: Dictionary of Belgian painters born between 1750 & 1875

External links

1859 births
1923 deaths
19th-century Belgian painters
19th-century Belgian male artists
20th-century Belgian painters
Cat artists
Dog artists
20th-century Belgian male artists